The windowpane oyster (Placuna placenta) is a bivalve marine mollusk in the family of Placunidae. They are edible, but valued more for their shells (and the rather small pearls). The shells have been used for thousands of years as a glass substitute because of their durability and translucence. More recently, they have been used in the manufacture of decorative items such as chandeliers and lampshades; in this use, the shell is known as capiz shell (kapis). Capiz shells are also used as raw materials for glue, chalk and varnish.

Distribution extends from the shallows of the Gulf of Aden to around the Philippines, where it is abundant in the eponymous province of Capiz.

Populations have been in decline because of destructive methods of fishing and gathering such as trawling, dredging, blast fishing and surface-supplied diving. In the Philippines, fisheries are now regulated through permits, quotas, size limits and protected habitats. In spite of this, resources continue to be depleted.

The shell is secured by a V-shaped ligament. Males and females are distinguished by the color of the gonads. Fertilization is external and larvae are free-swimming like plankton for 14 days or attached to surfaces via byssal thread during metamorphosis, eventually settling on the bottom. They consume plankton filtered from the water passing through their slightly opened shell; the shell closes if the bivalve is above water during low tide.

The capiz industry of Samal, Philippines

Aside from being abundant in the province of Capiz, capiz shells are also abundant in the island of Samal in the Philippines, where 500 tons of capiz shells are harvested every other year.

The capiz shells found around the island are harvested and transformed into various decorative products. As late as 2005, the residents of the island were trained to sustain the industry. However, the transfer of institutional knowledge to new generations to maintain the industry is not being maintained and is in danger of being lost.

See also
 Oyster
 Parol
Bahay na bato
 Philippine arts

References

Placunidae
Commercial molluscs
Molluscs described in 1758
Taxa named by Carl Linnaeus
Oysters
Edible molluscs
Philippine handicrafts